Man of Africa is a 1953 British drama film directed by Cyril Frankel. It was entered into the 1954 Cannes Film Festival.

Cast
 Frederick Bijuerenda - Jonathan
 Gordon Heath - Narrator (voice)
 Violet Mukabuerza - Violet

References

External links

1953 films
1953 drama films
Films directed by Cyril Frankel
British drama films
Films set in Uganda
1950s English-language films
1950s British films